Gang Injunction is a collaboration EP by rappers Young Buck & JT the Bigga Figga. The EP was released December 14, 2009 through the independent label Mandatory Digital. It sold 6,700 copies its first week of release and debuted on the Billboard 200 at number 106. All tracks on the EP were produced by JT the Bigga Figga.

Gang Injunction was the first single released by Buck & JT to promote the upcoming EP, however it did not make the cut when released in December 2009.

Track listing 

All lyrics by Young Buck & JT the Bigga Figga, music compositions listed below.

References 

2009 albums
Collaborative albums
JT the Bigga Figga albums
Young Buck albums